Mohamed Amine Meskini (Arabic: محمد أمين المسكيني; born 5 June 1997) is a Tunisian professional footballer who plays as a midfielder.

References

External links
 

1997 births
Living people
Association football midfielders
Tunisian footballers
Espérance Sportive de Tunis players
Tunisian Ligue Professionnelle 1 players